Jacobus Tirinus (1580–1636) was a Belgian Jesuit Biblical scholar. 

His major work is the Commentarius in Sacram Scripturam, a Bible commentary in two volumes from 1645. He also published a chorography, Chorographia Terrae Sanctae in Angustiorem Formam Redacta, around 1630.

Notes

External links
Jesuitica page

1580 births
1636 deaths
Jesuits of the Spanish Netherlands
Belgian biblical scholars